Lộc Ninh is a rural district of Bình Phước province in the Southeast region of Vietnam. As of 2003 the district had a population of 102,291. The district covers an area of 862.98 km². The district capital lies at Lộc Ninh.

Lộc Ninh township was the location of the 1967 "First Battle of Lộc Ninh" and the 1972 "Battle of Lộc Ninh" in the Vietnam War.

References

Districts of Bình Phước province